Moliniopsis is a monotypic genus of flowering plants belonging to the family Poaceae. It just contains one species, Moliniopsis japonica .

It is native to south-east China, Japan, Korea, Kuril Islands (Russian Island) and Sakhalin (Russian Island).

The genus name of Moliniopsis is in honour of Juan Ignacio Molina (1740–1829), was a Spanish Jesuit priest, naturalist, historian, translator, geographer, botanist, ornithologist, and linguist. The Latin specific epithet of japonica means "of Japan".
Both genus and species were first described and published in Bot. Mag. (Tokyo) Vol.39 on page 258 in 1925.

References

Monotypic Poaceae genera
Plants described in 1845
Flora of Sakhalin
Flora of the Kuril Islands
Flora of China
Flora of Japan
Flora of Korea